Mechanics (from Ancient Greek: μηχανική, mēkhanikḗ,  "of machines") is the area of mathematics and physics concerned with the relationships between force, matter, and motion among physical objects. Forces applied to objects result in displacements, or changes of an object's position relative to its environment.

Theoretical expositions of this branch of physics has its origins in Ancient Greece, for instance, in the writings of Aristotle and Archimedes (see History of classical mechanics and Timeline of classical mechanics). During the early modern period, scientists such as Galileo, Kepler, Huygens, and Newton laid the foundation for what is now known as classical mechanics.

As a branch of classical physics, mechanics deals with bodies that are either at rest or are moving with velocities significantly less than the speed of light. It can also be defined as the physical science that deals with the motion of and forces on bodies not in the quantum realm.

History

Antiquity

The ancient Greek philosophers were among the first to propose that abstract principles govern nature. The main theory of mechanics in antiquity was Aristotelian mechanics, though an alternative theory is exposed in the pseudo-Aristotelian Mechanical Problems, often attributed to one of his successors.

There is another tradition that goes back to the ancient Greeks where mathematics is used more extensively to analyze bodies statically or dynamically, an approach that may have been stimulated by prior work of the Pythagorean Archytas. Examples of this tradition include pseudo-Euclid (On the Balance), Archimedes (On the Equilibrium of Planes, On Floating Bodies), Hero (Mechanica), and Pappus (Collection, Book VIII).

Medieval age

In the Middle Ages, Aristotle's theories were criticized and modified by a number of figures, beginning with John Philoponus in the 6th century. A central problem was that of projectile motion, which was discussed by Hipparchus and Philoponus.

Persian Islamic polymath Ibn Sīnā published his theory of motion in The Book of Healing (1020). He said that an impetus is imparted to a projectile by the thrower, and viewed it as persistent, requiring external forces such as air resistance to dissipate it. Ibn Sina made distinction between 'force' and 'inclination' (called "mayl"), and argued that an object gained mayl when the object is in opposition to its natural motion. So he concluded that continuation of motion is attributed to the inclination that is transferred to the object, and that object will be in motion until the mayl is spent. He also claimed that a projectile in a vacuum would not stop unless it is acted upon, consistent with Newton's first law of motion.

On the question of a body subject to a constant (uniform) force, the 12th-century Jewish-Arab scholar Hibat Allah Abu'l-Barakat al-Baghdaadi (born Nathanel, Iraqi, of Baghdad) stated that constant force imparts constant acceleration. According to Shlomo Pines, al-Baghdaadi's theory of motion was "the oldest negation of Aristotle's fundamental dynamic law [namely, that a constant force produces a uniform motion], [and is thus an] anticipation in a vague fashion of the fundamental law of classical mechanics [namely, that a force applied continuously produces acceleration]."

Influenced by earlier writers such as Ibn Sina and al-Baghdaadi, the 14th-century French priest Jean Buridan developed the theory of impetus, which later developed into the modern theories of inertia, velocity, acceleration and momentum. This work and others was developed in 14th-century England by the Oxford Calculators  such as Thomas Bradwardine, who studied and formulated various laws regarding falling bodies. The concept that the main properties of a body are uniformly accelerated motion (as of falling bodies) was worked out by the 14th-century Oxford Calculators.

Early modern age

Two central figures in the early modern age are Galileo Galilei and Isaac Newton. Galileo's final statement of his mechanics, particularly of falling bodies, is his Two New Sciences (1638). Newton's 1687 Philosophiæ Naturalis Principia Mathematica provided a detailed mathematical account of mechanics, using the newly developed mathematics of calculus and providing the basis of Newtonian mechanics.

There is some dispute over priority of various ideas: Newton's Principia is certainly the seminal work and has been tremendously influential, and many of the mathematics results therein could not have been stated earlier without the development of the calculus. However, many of the ideas, particularly as pertain to inertia and falling bodies, had been developed by prior scholars such as Christiaan Huygens and the less-known medieval predecessors. Precise credit is at times difficult or contentious because scientific language and standards of proof changed, so whether medieval statements are equivalent to modern statements or sufficient proof, or instead similar to modern statements and hypotheses is often debatable.

Modern age

Two main modern developments in mechanics are general relativity of Einstein, and quantum mechanics, both developed in the 20th century based in part on earlier 19th-century ideas. The development in the modern continuum mechanics, particularly in the areas of elasticity, plasticity, fluid dynamics, electrodynamics and thermodynamics of deformable media, started in the second half of the 20th century.

Types of mechanical bodies

The often-used term body needs to stand for a wide assortment of objects, including particles, projectiles, spacecraft, stars, parts of machinery, parts of solids, parts of fluids (gases and liquids), etc.

Other distinctions between the various sub-disciplines of mechanics, concern the nature of the bodies being described. Particles are bodies with little (known) internal structure, treated as mathematical points in classical mechanics. Rigid bodies have size and shape, but retain a simplicity close to that of the particle, adding just a few so-called degrees of freedom, such as orientation in space.

Otherwise, bodies may be semi-rigid, i.e. elastic, or non-rigid, i.e. fluid. These subjects have both classical and quantum divisions of study.

For instance, the motion of a spacecraft, regarding its orbit and attitude (rotation), is described by the relativistic theory of classical mechanics, while the analogous movements of an atomic nucleus are described by quantum mechanics.

Sub-disciplines 

The following are two lists of various subjects that are studied in mechanics.

Note that there is also the "theory of fields" which constitutes a separate discipline in physics, formally treated as distinct from mechanics, whether classical fields or quantum fields. But in actual practice, subjects belonging to mechanics and fields are closely interwoven. Thus, for instance, forces that act on particles are frequently derived from fields (electromagnetic or gravitational), and particles generate fields by acting as sources. In fact, in quantum mechanics, particles themselves are fields, as described theoretically by the wave function.

Classical 

The following are described as forming classical mechanics:
 Newtonian mechanics, the original theory of motion (kinematics) and forces (dynamics).
 Analytical mechanics is a reformulation of Newtonian mechanics with an emphasis on system energy, rather than on forces. There are two main branches of analytical mechanics:
 Hamiltonian mechanics, a theoretical formalism, based on the principle of conservation of energy.
 Lagrangian mechanics, another theoretical formalism, based on the principle of the least action.
 Classical statistical mechanics generalizes ordinary classical mechanics to consider systems in an unknown state; often used to derive thermodynamic properties.
 Celestial mechanics, the motion of bodies in space: planets, comets, stars, galaxies, etc.
 Astrodynamics, spacecraft navigation, etc.
 Solid mechanics, elasticity, plasticity, viscoelasticity exhibited by deformable solids.
 Fracture mechanics 
 Acoustics, sound ( = density variation propagation) in solids, fluids and gases.
 Statics, semi-rigid bodies in mechanical equilibrium
 Fluid mechanics, the motion of fluids
 Soil mechanics, mechanical behavior of soils
 Continuum mechanics, mechanics of continua (both solid and fluid)
 Hydraulics, mechanical properties of liquids
 Fluid statics, liquids in equilibrium
 Applied mechanics, or Engineering mechanics
 Biomechanics, solids, fluids, etc. in biology
 Biophysics, physical processes in living organisms
 Relativistic or Einsteinian mechanics, universal gravitation.

Quantum 
The following are categorized as being part of quantum mechanics:
 Schrödinger wave mechanics, used to describe the movements  of the wavefunction of a single particle.
 Matrix mechanics is an alternative formulation that allows considering systems with a finite-dimensional state space.
 Quantum statistical mechanics generalizes ordinary quantum mechanics to consider systems in an unknown state; often used to derive thermodynamic properties.
 Particle physics, the motion, structure, and reactions of particles
 Nuclear physics, the motion, structure, and reactions of nuclei
 Condensed matter physics, quantum gases, solids, liquids, etc.

Historically, classical mechanics had been around for nearly a quarter millennium before quantum mechanics developed. Classical mechanics originated with Isaac Newton's laws of motion in Philosophiæ Naturalis Principia Mathematica, developed over the seventeenth century. Quantum mechanics developed later, over the nineteenth century, precipitated by Planck's postulate and Albert Einstein's explanation of the photoelectric effect. Both fields are commonly held to constitute the most certain knowledge that exists about physical nature.

Classical mechanics has especially often been viewed as a model for other so-called exact sciences. Essential in this respect is the extensive use of mathematics in theories, as well as the decisive role played by experiment in generating and testing them.

Quantum mechanics is of a bigger scope, as it encompasses classical mechanics as a sub-discipline which applies under certain restricted circumstances. According to the correspondence principle, there is no contradiction or conflict between the two subjects, each simply pertains to specific situations. The correspondence principle states that the behavior of systems described by quantum theories reproduces classical physics in the limit of large quantum numbers, i.e. if quantum mechanics is applied to large systems (for e.g. a baseball), the result would almost be the same if classical mechanics had been applied. Quantum mechanics has superseded classical mechanics at the foundation level and is indispensable for the explanation and prediction of processes at the molecular, atomic, and sub-atomic level. However, for macroscopic processes classical mechanics is able to solve problems which are unmanageably difficult (mainly due to computational limits) in quantum mechanics and hence remains useful and well used.
Modern descriptions of such behavior begin with a careful definition of such quantities as displacement (distance moved), time, velocity, acceleration, mass, and force. Until about 400 years ago, however, motion was explained from a very different point of view. For example, following the ideas of Greek philosopher and scientist Aristotle, scientists reasoned that a cannonball falls down because its natural position is in the Earth; the sun, the moon, and the stars travel in circles around the earth because it is the nature of heavenly objects to travel in perfect circles.

Often cited as father to modern science, Galileo brought together the ideas of other great thinkers of his time and began to calculate motion in terms of distance travelled from some starting position and the time that it took. He showed that the speed of falling objects increases steadily during the time of their fall. This acceleration is the same for heavy objects as for light ones, provided air friction (air resistance) is discounted. The English mathematician and physicist Isaac Newton improved this analysis by defining force and mass and relating these to acceleration. For objects traveling at speeds close to the speed of light, Newton's laws were superseded by Albert Einstein's theory of relativity. [A sentence illustrating the computational complication of Einstein's theory of relativity.] For atomic and subatomic particles, Newton's laws were superseded by quantum theory. For everyday phenomena, however, Newton's three laws of motion remain the cornerstone of dynamics, which is the study of what causes motion.

Relativistic 
In analogy to the distinction between quantum and classical mechanics, Albert Einstein's general and special theories of relativity have expanded the scope of Newton and Galileo's formulation of mechanics. The differences between relativistic and Newtonian mechanics become significant and even dominant as the velocity of a body approaches the speed of light.

For high-energy processes, quantum mechanics must be adjusted to account for special relativity; this has led to the development of quantum field theory.

Professional organizations 

Applied Mechanics Division, American Society of Mechanical Engineers
Fluid Dynamics Division, American Physical Society
Society for Experimental Mechanics
Institution of Mechanical Engineers is the United Kingdom's qualifying body for mechanical engineers and has been the home of Mechanical Engineers for over 150 years.
International Union of Theoretical and Applied Mechanics

See also 

Applied mechanics
Dynamics
Engineering
Index of engineering science and mechanics articles
Kinematics
Kinetics
Non-autonomous mechanics
Statics
Wiesen Test of Mechanical Aptitude (WTMA)

References

Further reading

 Robert Stawell Ball (1871) Experimental Mechanics from Google books.

External links 

  iMechanica: the web of mechanics and mechanicians
  Mechanics Definition
  Mechanics Blog by a Purdue University Professor
 The Mechanics program at Virginia Tech
 Physclips: Mechanics with animations and video clips from the University of New South Wales
  U.S. National Committee on Theoretical and Applied Mechanics
 Interactive learning resources for teaching Mechanics
 The Archimedes Project

 
Articles containing video clips